Bluey is an Australian nickname for a person with red hair.

As a nickname, Bluey may refer to:

Frank 'Bluey' Adams (born 1935), former Australian rules football player
Derek Arnold (born 1941), New Zealand former rugby union player
David Bairstow (1951–1998), English cricketer
Arthur Bluethenthal (1891–1918), American college football player and World War I pilot
Gregory Brazel (born 1954), Australian serial killer
Alex Burdon (1879–1943), pioneer Australian rugby league and rugby union footballer
Greg Mackey (born 1961), Australian former rugby league footballer
Jean-Paul 'Bluey' Maunick (born 1957), British musician, founder of the band Incognito
Brian McClennan (born 1962), New Zealand former rugby league footballer and coach
Bob McClure (footballer) (1925–2003), Australian rules footballer
Tim McGrath (born 1970), former Australian rules footballer
Guy McKenna (born 1969), Australian rules football coach and former player
Ian Shelton (footballer) (born 1940), former Australian rules footballer
Steve Southern (born 1982), Australian former rugby league footballer
Steve & Bluey, cartoon created by Steven Thomas Fischer
Keith Truscott (1916–1943), a Second World War ace fighter pilot and Australian rules footballer
Jack Watkins (died 1974), Australian rugby league footballer
Bluey Wilkinson (1911–1940), Australian speedway rider
Billy Wilson (Australian rugby league) (1927–1993), Australian rugby league footballer

See also 

 
 

Lists of people by nickname